Zealandotachina is a genus of parasitic flies in the family Tachinidae. There are about 10 described species in Zealandotachina.

Species
These 10 species belong to the genus Zealandotachina:
 Zealandotachina infuscata Malloch, 1938
 Zealandotachina lamellata Malloch, 1938
 Zealandotachina latifrons Malloch, 1938
 Zealandotachina nigrifemorata Malloch, 1938
 Zealandotachina quadriseta Malloch, 1938
 Zealandotachina quadrivittata Malloch, 1938
 Zealandotachina setigera Malloch, 1938
 Zealandotachina subtilis (Hutton, 1901)
 Zealandotachina tenuis Malloch, 1938
 Zealandotachina varipes Malloch, 1938

References

Further reading

 
 
 
 

Tachinidae
Articles created by Qbugbot